The 7th Australian Academy of Cinema and Television Arts International Awards (commonly known as the AACTA International Awards is presented by the Australian Academy of Cinema and Television Arts (AACTA), a non-profit organisation whose aim is to identify, award, promote and celebrate Australia's greatest achievements in film and television. Awards were handed out for the best films of 2017 regardless of the country of origin, and are the international counterpart to the awards for Australian films. The awards were presented on 5 January 2018 at The Avalon in Hollywood.

Nominees
The nominees were announced on December 13, 2017.

See also
24th Screen Actors Guild Awards
23rd Critics' Choice Awards
71st British Academy Film Awards
75th Golden Globe Awards
90th Academy Awards

References

External links
 The Official Australian Academy of Cinema and Television Arts website

AACTA International Awards
AACTA International Awards
AACTA Awards ceremonies
AACTA International
2018 in American cinema